Liolaemus salitrosus is a species of lizard in the family Iguanidae.  It is from Argentina.

References

salitrosus
Lizards of South America
Reptiles of Argentina
Endemic fauna of Argentina
Reptiles described in 2021
Taxa named by Cristian Simón Abdala